Olumuyiwa "Olu" Famutimi (born February 21, 1984) is a Canadian professional basketball player for the Scarborough Shooting Stars of the Canadian Elite Basketball League (CEBL). He played college basketball for Arkansas.

Early life 
Famutimi is of Nigerian descent. He was first noticed in a high school game at Chaminade College School in Toronto, Ontario, in his freshman year. Less than a year later, he transferred to Flint Northwestern High School in Flint, Michigan. In Michigan, he played for the Flint Northwestern Wildcats and climbed the national ranks as the seventh best player in the country, according to ESPN.com. A career altering injury would change all of that, as he was ushered out of the limelight because of it.

Collegiate career 
Famutimi played two seasons at the University of Arkansas, where he earned All-Southeastern Conference Freshman honors. In 57 games with the Razorbacks, he averaged 8.3 points and 3.9 rebounds in 22.2 minutes per game. Against all odds, he declared early for the 2005 NBA Draft and was not selected.

Professional career 
Famutimi was invited to training camp with the Philadelphia 76ers and made appearances in four preseason games (4.5 ppg, 2.0 rpg) before being waived. He played 47 games for the Arkansas RimRockers in 2005–06, and averaged 6.8 points and 2.7 rebounds in 16.5 minutes per game while shooting .513 (122-238) from the field. Famutimi signed with the San Antonio Spurs as a free agent in 2006, but was waived before the season started. He played in Turkey for two years and also played in France, Germany and Ukraine.
 
On December 17, 2013, Famutimi signed with the Halifax Rainmen of the NBL Canada. After a one-year stint with the Island Storm, Famutimi signed with the Saint John Mill Rats on March 14, 2016.

On August 18, 2016, Famutimi signed with Quilmes de Mar del Plata of the Liga Nacional de Básquet. In October 2016, he parted ways with Quilmes after appearing in ten games.

On November 3, 2016, he signed with Saint John Riptide for the 2016–17 NBL Canada season.

He played the 2019 CEBL season for the Guelph Nighthawks. Famutimi joined the KW Titans in 2019. Famutimi joined the Edmonton Stingers for the 2021–22 BCL Americas.

On May 12, 2022, Famutimi signed with the Scarborough Shooting Stars of the CEBL.

International career 
Famutimi plays internationally for the Canadian national team.

References

External links
French LNB profile
TBLStat.net Profile

1984 births
Living people
Arkansas Razorbacks men's basketball players
Arkansas RimRockers players
Basketball players from Toronto
BC Khimik players
Black Canadian basketball players
Canadian expatriate basketball people in France
Canadian expatriate basketball people in Germany
Canadian expatriate basketball people in Turkey
Canadian expatriate basketball people in the United States
Canadian sportspeople of Nigerian descent
Cape Breton Highlanders (basketball) players
Edmonton Stingers players
Guelph Nighthawks players
Halifax Rainmen players
KW Titans players
Island Storm players
McDonald's High School All-Americans
Oyak Renault basketball players
Parade High School All-Americans (boys' basketball)
Metropolitans 92 players
Quilmes de Mar del Plata basketball players
Saint John Mill Rats players
Saint John Riptide players
Scarborough Shooting Stars players
Shooting guards
Small forwards
TED Ankara Kolejliler players
2010 FIBA World Championship players